Bibaho Obhijaan is an Indian Bengali-language comedy drama film directed by Birsa Dasgupta and produced by Shrikant Mohta and Mahendra Soni. The film stars Ankush Hazra and Bangladeshi actress Nusraat Faria in lead roles, and Priyanka Sarkar, Rudranil Ghosh, Anirban Bhattacharya and Sohini Sarkar in a supporting role. This film was released on 21 June 2019 under the banner of Shree Venkatesh Films. The music direction of the movie was made by Jeet Gannguli. A standalone sequel named Abar Bibaho Obhijaan.

Plot
Two close friends Anupam and Rajat decide to marry. Rajat marries Maya who is always busy in performing religious rituals or watching trash tele serials whereas Anupam marries Rai, a women's activist and social worker. Later, they become frustrated with their married life. On the other side Ganesh Maity, a village boy, loves village girl Malati but cannot express his feelings. In an attempt to impress her, he turns into a dacoit named Bullet Singh and kidnaps Anupam and Rajat. The friend duos now realise the consequences of conjugal life which is like the quarreling of Tom and Jerry.

Cast
 Ankush Hazra as Anupam Banerjee 
 Nusrat Faria as Rai
 Rudranil Ghosh as Rajat
 Sohini Sarkar as Maya
 Anirban Bhattacharya as  Ganesh Maity aka Gonsha aka Bullet Singh
 Priyanka Sarkar as Malati
 Puja Banerjee as a Item number song "Michhrir Dana"
 Ambarish Bhattacharya as Police inspector
 Sandy Saha as Sona
 Rupsha Guha as Ranja
 Manosi Sengupta 
 Nabanita Mazumder
 Debapratim Dasgupta
 Arijita Mukhopadhyay 
 Mallika Banerjee
 Sanghasri Sinngha Mitra

Release 
The film was theatrically released on 21 June 2019.

Reception 
The film received mixed response from critics who praised the acting performance of Anirban Bhattacharya but criticised the direction and plot. In The Times of India, Srijoy Mukherjee wrote "Bibaho Obhijaan is a fun and light-hearted romp", but also criticised  it saying "the humour is shallow and picks on easy targets".

In Firstpost, Bhaskar Chattopadhyay called this film "An irredeemable offering despite some rare laugh-out-loud moments", stating "Unfortunately, for most of its two-hour duration, Bibaho Obhijaan is simply not funny enough". But he also praised Anirban Bhattacharya's acting stating "There would not be an ounce of exaggeration to say that if he would not have been in the film, the film would have fared very, very poorly. The young actor single-handedly saves the film from sinking and is clearly its biggest star".

Soundtrack

Awards
 West Bengal Film Journalists' Association Awards for Best Performance in a Comic Role - Anirban Bhattacharya (Won) for Bibaho Obhijaan

Kalkar Awards 2020 in a Best Actor (Male)  Ankush Hazra for Bibaho Obhijaan

Films and Frames Digital Film Awards 2020	in a Best Actor (Comic Role) Ankush Hazra for Bibaho Obhijaan

References

External links
 

2019 films
Bengali-language Indian films
2010s Bengali-language films
Indian comedy-drama films
Films scored by Jeet Ganguly
2019 comedy-drama films
Films directed by Birsa Dasgupta